Simon Woolford (born 7 April 1975) is an Australian professional rugby league coach who was most recently the head coach of the Huddersfield Giants in the Super League, and a former professional rugby league footballer.

He played in the NRL for the Canberra Raiders and the St. George Illawarra Dragons, and represented Country in the City vs Country Origin match in 2002.

Background
Woolford was born in Young, New South Wales, Australia.

Playing career
He played for the Canberra Raiders and St. George Illawarra Dragons in the NRL. He made his first grade debut for Canberra on 29 May 1994 in round 11 of the season. He played for NSW Country in the City vs Country Origin match in 2002.

Coaching career
Woolford coached the Queanbeyan Blues in the Canberra Rugby League competition. In 2015 he was suspended for nine months after breaking the window of the coaching box. This was later overturned in a retrial and a suspended sentence of 3 months was handed out. In 2016, Woolford began coaching the Newcastle Intrust Super Premiership NSW side and in 2017 took the club to the finals.

On 29 April 2018 Woolford was announced as the head coach of Huddersfield Giants in Super league on a two and half year deal. He took over form Chris Thorman, who had been in charge on an interim basis following the sacking of Rick Stone earlier in the season.

At the start of the 2020 Super League season, it was announced that Woolford would be departing Huddersfield at the end of the campaign.   On 16 September 2020, Woolford resigned from Huddersfield with immediate effect after a poor run of results.

References

Sources

External links
Newcastle Knights profile
 Simon Woolford's Profile

 

1975 births
Australian expatriate sportspeople in England
Living people
Australian rugby league coaches
Australian rugby league players
Canberra Raiders captains
Canberra Raiders players
Country New South Wales Origin rugby league team players
Huddersfield Giants coaches
Rugby league hookers
Rugby league players from Young, New South Wales
St. George Illawarra Dragons players